2b Theatre Company, stylized as the 2b theatre company, is a theatre company based in Halifax, Nova Scotia.

History 
2b was founded by a group of recent graduates and emerging artists in 1999 under the name "Bunnies in the Headlights Theatre." In 2004, Christian Barry and Anthony Black took over as artistic co-directors, and reinvented the company as 2b theatre.

Mandate 
2b theatre company strives to stimulate the mind and to awaken the spirit by producing theatre that is vital, innovative and challenging. Based in Halifax, Nova Scotia, 2b theatre company creates, develops, and presents works for the regional, national and international stages.

Touring 
While based in Halifax, 2b is a touring company. To date, 2b has toured to 40 cities in 10 countries on four continents.

List of cities visited by 2b:

 Aarhus
 Albany, Western Australia
 Antigonish
 Auckland
 Burnaby
 Calgary
 Charleston
 Chester
 Cork
 Cow Head
 Dartmouth
 Denmark
 Edinburgh
 Edmonton
 Fredericton
 Groningen
 Halifax
 Hannover
 Kitchener
 London, Ontario
 Melbourne
 Memphis
 Moncton
 Montreal
 Mumbai
 Nashville
 New York
 North Vancouver
 Ottawa
 Parrsboro
 Pittsburgh
 Regina
 Saint John
 Salt Spring Island
 Stephenville
 Stratford, Ontario
 Sydney
 Toronto
 Vancouver
 Victoria
 Wellington
 Whitehorse
 Windsor

Recent productions 
 Unconscious at the Sistine Chapel
 We Are Not Alone
 What a Young Wife Ought to Know 
 The God that Comes
 When it Rains

Awards and nominations

References

Theatre companies in Nova Scotia
1999 establishments in Nova Scotia
Arts organizations established in 2009